The 2018 European Tour is the 47th season of golf tournaments since the European Tour officially began in 1972 and the 10th edition of the Race to Dubai.

The Race to Dubai was won by Italian Francesco Molinari, who was also named Golfer of the Year. India's Shubhankar Sharma was named Sir Henry Cotton Rookie of the Year.

Changes for 2018
There were changes to membership criteria with the reversal of some of the changes introduced for the 2017 season; the number of players gaining exemption from the final Race to Dubai standings reverted to the top 110 and the Access List was scrapped, largely replaced by a re-ranking system.

The Race to Dubai points system was adjusted, with all prize money being converted into US dollars before translating into points (1 point = 1 dollar) having previously been calculated after converting into euro. The points for all tournaments were also fixed prior to the start of the season, having previously been set during each tournament week, thereby negating any fluctuation in exchange rates.

Tournament changes 
New tournaments: Oman Open.
Returning tournaments (not part of the 2017 season): Open de España, AfrAsia Bank Mauritius Open (missing from the 2017 schedule due to date change), Belgian Knockout (formerly the Belgian Open).
No longer part of the schedule: Alfred Dunhill Championship (not held due to course renovations; returned for the 2019 season), Open de Portugal (dropped down to the Challenge Tour), Shenzhen International, Paul Lawrie Matchplay.
Format change: the Lyoness Open (Austrian Open) became the Shot Clock Masters, with all shots subject to a strict time limit before incurring penalty strokes.

Schedule
The following table lists official events during the 2018 season.

Unofficial events
The following events were sanctioned by the European Tour, but did not carry official money, nor were wins official.

Location of tournaments

Race to Dubai
Since 2009, the European Tour's money list has been known as the "Race to Dubai". It was based on money earned during the season and calculated in points based on US dollars with 1dollar=1point, and prize money for all tournaments being converted into points at the beginning of the season.

Final standings
Final top 10 players in the Race to Dubai:

• Did not play

Awards

Golfer of the Month

See also
2017 in golf
2018 in golf
2018 Challenge Tour
2018 European Senior Tour
2018 PGA Tour

Notes

References

2018
2018 in golf